Leptochiton is a genus of polyplacophoran molluscs.  

Some Leptochiton species became extinct during the Pliocene period, but there are also extant species.

Distribution
Worldwide.

Species
 Leptochiton antarcticus Sirenko, 2015
 Leptochiton asellus (Gmelin, 1791) - type species
 Leptochiton bergenhayni Saito, 2011
 Leptochiton beui Sirenko, 2020
 Leptochiton inquinatus (Reeve, 1847)
 Leptochiton kerguelensis (Haddon, 1886)
 Leptochiton laurae Schwabe & Sellanes, 2010
 Leptochiton longibranchiae Sirenko, 2015
 Leptochiton longisetosus Sigwart & Sirenko, 2012
 Leptochiton longispinus Saito, 2001
 Leptochiton lukini Sirenko, 1990
 Leptochiton macleani Sirenko, 2015
 Leptochiton madagascaricus Sirenko, 2019
 Leptochiton marshalli Sirenko, 2020
 Leptochiton muelleri Sirenko & Schwabe, 2011
 Leptochiton mutschkeae Sirenko, 2015
 Leptochiton myeikensis Saito & Aung, 2021
 Leptochiton neocaledonicus Sirenko, 2016
 Leptochiton pseudogloriosus Strack, 1991
 Leptochiton pumilus Sirenko & Saito, 2020
 Leptochiton rarinota (Jeffreys, 1883)
 Leptochiton subantarcticus (Iredale & Hull, 1930)
 Leptochiton surugensis Saito, 1997
 Leptochiton sykesi (G. B. Sowerby III, 1903)
 Leptochiton tahitiensis Sirenko, 2020
 Leptochiton taiwanensis Sirenko, 2018
 Leptochiton tenuidontus Saito & Okutani, 1990
 Leptochiton tenuis Kaas, 1979
 and many more

References

External links
 Gray, J. E. (1847). A list of the genera of recent Mollusca, their synonyma and types. Proceedings of the Zoological Society of London. (1847) 15: 129-219

Chiton genera
Jurassic first appearances
Taxa named by John Edward Gray